The 1948 Lafayette Leopards football team was an American football team that represented Lafayette College during the 1948 college football season.  In its second season under head coach Ivy Williamson, the team compiled a 7–2 record and outscored its opponents by a total of 277 to 171. The team played its home games at Fisher Field in Easton, Pennsylvania. The team is notable for declining an invitation to the 1949 Sun Bowl, as African-American running back David Showell would not have been allowed to play in the game.

Schedule

References

Lafayette
Lafayette Leopards football seasons
Lafayette football